Mount Arriva is an  elevation mountain summit located in the North Cascades in the U.S. state of Washington. It is situated in North Cascades National Park, on the shared border of Chelan County and Skagit County. Its nearest higher peak is Black Peak,  to the southeast. Mount Arriva has a secondary summit, called East Peak (8,160+ ft), which was first climbed in August 1940 by Fred Beckey, Jim Crooks, and Ed Kennedy. The first ascent of the true summit (West Peak) was made July 6, 1966, by Joe and Joan Firey, John and Irene Meulemans.

Climate

Mount Arriva is located in the marine west coast climate zone of western North America. This climate supports a small glacier on the northeast side of the peak. Most weather fronts originate in the Pacific Ocean, and travel northeast toward the Cascade Mountains. As fronts approach the North Cascades, they are forced upward by the peaks of the Cascade Range, causing them to drop their moisture in the form of rain or snowfall onto the Cascades (Orographic lift). As a result, the west side of the North Cascades experiences high precipitation, especially during the winter months in the form of snowfall. Due to its temperate climate and proximity to the Pacific Ocean, areas west of the Cascade Crest very rarely experience temperatures below  or above . During winter months, weather is usually cloudy, but, due to high pressure systems over the Pacific Ocean that intensify during summer months, there is often little or no cloud cover during the summer. Because of maritime influence, snow tends to be wet and heavy, resulting in high avalanche danger. Precipitation runoff from Mount Arriva drains into tributaries of the Stehekin and Skagit Rivers.

Geology
The North Cascades features some of the most rugged topography in the Cascade Range with craggy peaks and ridges and deep glacial valleys. Geological events occurring many years ago created the diverse topography and drastic elevation changes over the Cascade Range leading to the various climate differences. These climate differences lead to vegetation variety defining the ecoregions in this area.

The history of the formation of the Cascade Mountains dates back millions of years ago to the late Eocene Epoch. With the North American Plate overriding the Pacific Plate, episodes of volcanic igneous activity persisted.  In addition, small fragments of the oceanic and continental lithosphere called terranes created the North Cascades about 50 million years ago.

During the Pleistocene period dating back over two million years ago, glaciation advancing and retreating repeatedly scoured the landscape leaving deposits of rock debris. The "U"-shaped cross section of the river valleys are a result of recent glaciation. Uplift and faulting in combination with glaciation have been the dominant processes which have created the tall peaks and deep valleys of the North Cascades area.

See also

 Geography of the North Cascades
 List of Highest Mountain Peaks in Washington (#69)

References

External links
 Mt. Arriva north face: PBase aerial photo
 Mt. Arriva west face: PBase aerial photo
 Mt. Arriva south face: PBase aerial photo
 Weather forecast: Mt. Arriva

Arriva
Arriva
Arriva
Arriva
Arriva
Arriva
Arriva
North American 2000 m summits